The Roman Catholic Diocese of Anuradhapura (Lat: Dioecesis Anuradhapurensis) is a diocese of the Latin Church of the Roman Catholic Church in Sri Lanka.

Originally erected as the apostolic prefecture of Anuradhapura, the prefecture was created from territory in the Diocese of Jaffna and the Diocese of Trincomalee-Batticaloa.

The prefecture was elevated to a full diocese in 1982, and is a suffragan to the Archdiocese of Colombo.

The current bishop is Norbert Marshall Andradi, appointed in 2003.

Ordinaries
Henry Swithin Thomas Alexander Wijetunge Goonewardena, O.M.I. † (20 Dec 1975 Appointed - 2 Nov 1995 Resigned) 
Oswald Thomas Colman Gomis (2 Nov 1995 Appointed - 6 Jul 2002 Appointed, Archbishop of Colombo) 
Norbert Marshall Andradi, O.M.I. (14 Nov 2003 Appointed - )

See also
Catholic Church in Sri Lanka

References
Catholic Hierarchy
GCatholic

Anuradhapura